iHuman is a documentary about artificial intelligence, social control and power. The film shows how this technology is changing our lives, our society and our future. Such experts as Ilya Sutskever and Jürgen Schmidhuber give interviews about AI and how it is developed and implemented. It also features the leading minds in the field Max Tegmark, Kara Swisher, Michal Kosinski, Stuart Russel, Ben Wizner, Hao Li, Ben Goertzel and Philip Alston. The documentary features its own character representing AI that develops through the film. This character has an abstract VFX form done by Theodor Groeneboom. The constant surveillance through phones, internet, systems in society and through surveillance cameras is discussed as topic crucial for development of AI. The question is posed, if we already are governed by algorithms that are created by big tech corporations, governments and the military industry. It mentions Palantir Technologies and Cambridge Analytica.

The film premiered at the 2019 International Documentary Film Festival Amsterdam on 23 November.

See also 
 Lo and Behold, Reveries of the Connected World
 Existential risk from artificial general intelligence
 Regulation of algorithms
 Social Credit System

References

External links 
 

2019 documentary films
2019 films
Norwegian documentary films
Films about artificial intelligence
Government by algorithm in fiction
Social reputation in fiction
2010s English-language films